The Kingdom of Jolof, also known as Wolof and Wollof, was a West African rump state located in what is today the nation of Senegal. For nearly two hundred years, the Wolof rulers of the Jolof Empire collected tribute from vassal kings states who voluntarily agreed to the confederacy. At the Battle of Danki, the Buurba Jolof was defeated by the lord of Kayor resulting in the rapid disintegration of the empire. Jolof survived as a meager state, unable to prosper from the Atlantic trade between its former vassal territories and the Portuguese.

Mauretanian promise
In 1670, wandering Muslim clerics from Mauretania stirred up a rebellion against the Wolof rulers by a ruse. They promised to show the Wolof people how to produce millet without the labor of planting. During the ensuing rebellion, the Mauretanians invaded, killed the rulers of Waalo and Kayor and defeated the burba Jolof. However, when the Mauretanians could not deliver on their promise, the Wolof restored their rulers and drove the invaders out. This claim is questionable because most rural Wolofs are strong farmers who produce millet and other crops. The Mauretanians still remained a problem, however; and Waalo in particular suffered from their constant raids.

Baol and Kayor

In 1686, Baol split from Kayor under the teny (king) Lat Sukabe Fall. The burba Jolof used this as an excuse to try and hem in his crumbling empire and invaded Kayor. Sukabe, fearing for his own security, invaded Kayor and killed the burba Jolof in battle. He then annexed Kayor creating a union of the two states that would last until his death in 1702. Thereafter, the two states would be ruled by his sons. By the late 18th century, Kayor was pre-eminent again and annexed Baol while inflicting serious defeats on the Muslim al-Mami of Futa Toro in 1786.

Destruction
Around 1875, Ahmadu Shaykhu of the Imamate of Futa Jallon took his jihad to Djolof. The empire was more or less annexed until 1890. From then on, it was absorbed into the French colony administered from Dakar.

See also
List of rulers of Jolof
Cayor Kingdom
History of Senegal
History of the Gambia
Wolof people
Serer people
Mali Empire
Jolof Empire
Anna Kingsley

Sources

References

States and territories established in 1350
States and territories disestablished in 1900
Former empires in Africa
French West Africa
History of Senegal
Countries in medieval Africa
Countries in precolonial Africa
1549 establishments in Africa